Michèle Verly (real name Michèle Armande Houillon) (19 July 1909 – 3 March 1952) was a French stage and film actress. She was managing director of the Théâtre Gramont from August 1945 until her untimely death. She died in the 1952 Air France SNCASE Languedoc crash and is buried in the Batignolles Cemetery (31st division) in Paris.

Filmography 
 1926 : La Tournée Farigoule by Marcel Manchez
 1927 : Belphégor by Henri Desfontaines (film in 4 episodes)
 1927 : La Grande Épreuve by Alexandre Ryder and A. Dugès
 1927 : Madonna of the Sleeping Cars by Marco de Gastyne and Maurice Gleize
 1928 : The Passenger by Jacques de Baroncelli
 1928 : La Symphonie pathétique by Henri Étiévant and Mario Nalpas
 1929 : Monte Cristo by Henri Fescourt (film shot in two periods)
 1929 : Fécondité by Henri Étiévant and Nikolai Evreinov
 1929 : La Maison des hommes vivants by Marcel Dumont
 1929 : Les Taciturnes by Jacques de Casembroot
 1930 : Our Masters, the Servants
 1931 : Nos maîtres les domestiques by Grantham Hayes
 1932 : The Chocolate Girl by Marc Allégret
 1932 : Le Chien qui parle by Robert Rips (short film)
 1934 : The Lady of Lebanon by Jean Epstein : Christian Matras
 1934 : Votre sourire by Monty Banks and Pierre Caron
 1935 : Mon curé fait des miracles by Albert Depont (moyen métrage)
 1936 : La Belle Équipe by Julien Duvivier
 1939 : L'Embuscade by Fernand Rivers

Theatre 
Comedian
 1935 : Margot by Édouard Bourdet, directed by Pierre Fresnay, Théâtre Marigny
 1949 : Les Bonnes Cartes by Marcel Thiébaut, directed by Pierre Bertin, Théâtre Gramont
 1950 : Va faire un tour au bois by Roger Dornès, directed by Roland Piétri, Théâtre Gramont

Theatre director
 1948 : La Ligne de chance by Albert Husson, Théâtre Gramont
 1950 : Mon ami le cambrioleur by André Haguet, Théâtre Gramont

External links 
 
 Michèle Verly sur Les gens du cinéma.com
 Michèle Verly on 

French stage actresses
French film actresses
French silent film actresses
20th-century French actresses
French child actresses
Victims of aviation accidents or incidents in France
Actresses from Paris
1909 births
1952 deaths
Burials at Batignolles Cemetery
Victims of aviation accidents or incidents in 1952